The 2022 Campeonato Internacional de Tênis de Campinas was a professional tennis tournament played on clay courts. It was the eleventh edition of the tournament which was part of the 2022 ATP Challenger Tour. It took place in Campinas, Brazil between 3 and 9 October 2022.

Singles main-draw entrants

Seeds

 1 Rankings as of 26 September 2022.

Other entrants
The following players received wildcards into the singles main draw:
  Matheus Bueres
  Eduardo Ribeiro
  Thiago Seyboth Wild

The following player received entry into the singles main draw using a protected ranking:
  Sumit Nagal

The following players received entry into the singles main draw as alternates:
  Nicolás Kicker
  Pol Martín Tiffon
  Genaro Alberto Olivieri
  Juan Bautista Torres

The following players received entry from the qualifying draw:
  Jan Choinski
  Facundo Juárez
  Juan Pablo Paz
  José Pereira
  Daniel Rincón
  Gonzalo Villanueva

The following players received entry as lucky losers:
  Rémy Bertola
  Wilson Leite

Champions

Singles

  Jan Choinski def.  Juan Pablo Varillas 6–4, 6–4.

Doubles

  Boris Arias /  Federico Zeballos def.  Guido Andreozzi /  Guillermo Durán 7–5, 6–2.

References

Campeonato Internacional de Tênis de Campinas
2022
2022 in Brazilian tennis
October 2022 sports events in Brazil